The Dir is one of the largest and most prominent Somali clans in the Horn of Africa. They are also considered to be the oldest Somali stock to have inhabited the region. Its members inhabit Djibouti, Somalia, Ethiopia (Somali, Harar, Dire Dawa, Oromia and Afar regions), and northeastern Kenya (North Eastern Province).

Origins 
Like the great majority of Somali clans, the Dir trace their ancestry to Aqil ibn Abi Talib, a cousin of the prophet Muhammad and an older brother of Ali ibn Abi Talib and Ja'far ibn Abi Talib. They trace their lineage to Aqil through Samaale (the source of the name 'Somali'), the purported forefather of the northern pastoralist clans such as the Dir, the Hawiye, and –matrilineally through the Dir– the Isaaq and the Darod. Although these genealogical claims are historically untenable, they do reflect the longstanding cultural contacts between Somalia (especially, though not exclusively, its most northern part Somaliland) and Southern Arabia.

History 
The history of Islam being practised by the Dir clan goes back 1400 years. In Zeila, a Dir city, a mosque called Masjid al-Qiblatayn is known as the site of where early companions of the Prophet established a mosque shortly after the first Migration to Abyssinia  By the 7th century, a large-scale conversion to Islam was taking place in the Somali peninsula, first spread by the Dir clan family, to the rest of the nation.

The early Adal Kingdom (9th century to 13th century) was an exclusive Dir Kingdom with its capital being Zeila. In the 10th century, the Jarso clan a sub-division of Dir established the Dawaro Sultanate centred in Hararghe Highlands.

Dir is one of the oldest clans in the Horn of Africa. According to the Muslim chronicles, two of the oldest monarchies in the northern region, the Ifat and Adal sultanates, were led by Dir.

The Dir, along with the Akisho, Gurgura, Issa and Gadabuursi subclans of the Dir represent the most native and indigenous Somali clan tree in Harar.

The city Dire Dawa was originally called Dir Dhabe and used to be part of Adal Sultanate during the medieval times and was exclusively settled by Dir which is a major Somali tribe and after the weakening of Adal Sultanate, the Oromos took advantage and were able to penetrate through the city and settle into these areas and also assimilate some of the local Gurgura clan.

The Somali Dir clan used to be the predominant inhabitants of Hararghe Highlands in the medieval times until the weakening of Adal Sultanate the Oromos took advantage of the crippling state and decided to invade and occupy the Haraghe Highlands and assimilate the local native Somali population which were Jarso, Gurgura, Nole, Metta, Oborra and Bursuk who were all sub-clans of Dir a major Somali tribe tree and were later confederated into Oromo Ethnics, the Afran Qallo tribes .

The Dir were supporters of Imam Ahmad ibn Ibrahim al-Ghazi during his 16th century conquest of Abyssinia; especially the Gurgura, Issa, Bursuk and Gadabuursi. In his medieval Futuh Al-Habash documenting this campaign, the chronicler Shihāb al-Dīn indicates that thousands of Dir soldiers took part in Imam Ahmad's Adal Sultanate army.

The Dir clan also led a revolt against the Italians during the colonial period. This revolt was mainly led by the Biimaal section of the Dir. The Biimaal clan is widely known for leading a resistance against the colonials in southern Somalia.The Biimaal violently resisted the imposition of colonialism and fought against the Italian colonialists of Italian Somaliland in a twenty-year war known as the Bimal revolt in which many of their warriors assassinated several Italian governors. This revolt can be compared to the war of the Mad Mullah in Somaliland. The Biimaal mainly lives in Somalia, the Somali region of Ethiopia, which their Gaadsen sub-clan mainly inhabits and in the NEP region of Kenya. The Biimaal are pastoralists. They were also successful merchants and traders in the 19th century. In the 19th century they have engaged in multiple wars with the Geledi clan, which they were victorious in.

Lineage
I.M. Lewis and many sources maintain that the Dir, a Proto-Somali, together with the Hawiye trace ancestry through Irir son of Samaale. Dir is regarded as the father-in-law of Darod, the progenitor of the Darod clan Although some sources state it was the daughter of Hawiye who Darod married.

Dir clan lineages:
Madahweyne Dir - Akisho, (Gurre), Gurgura, Barsuug
Madaluug Dir - Gadabuursi
Madoobe Dir - Issa
Mahe Dir - Biimaal, Surre, Quranyow-Garre

According to others, Dir had a fifth son, Qaldho Dir.

DNA analysis of Dir clan members inhabiting Djibouti found that all of the individuals belonged to the Y-DNA T1 paternal haplogroup.

Branches

The main subclans of the Dir today are:
1. Mahe 
2. Madaluug
3. Madoobe 
4. Madahweyne 
 Akisho
 Issa  "Essa"
 Bimaal "Bimal"
 Gadabuursi "Gadabursi"
 Jaarso "Jaarso"
 Surre
 Quranyow of the Garre
 Gurgura "Gurgure"
 Gariire "Gerire"
 Gurre  "Goora"
 Bajimal "Bajumal"
 Barsuug "Bursuk"

For the first time since several centuries the Dir clan which widely dispersed in the Horn of Africa has successfully convened a meeting with all the major Dir subclans in Addis Ababa, Ethiopia. Suldaan Dhawal, of the Habr 'Affan Gadabuursi was elected the head and representative of the Dir clan in the Horn of Africa.

Clan tree

The following list is based on Nuova Antologia (1890), I.M. Lewis's book People of the Horn of Africa, and a paper published in March 2002 by Ambroso Guido: Clanship, Conflict and Refugees: An Introduction to Somalis in the Horn of Africa.
Samaale
Irir
Dir
Mahe Dir
Murdadle
Madobe 
Issa
Eleye
Walaldon
Horone
Furlabe
Urweyn
Wardiq 
Madaluug
Gadabursi/Samaron
Ali Gadabuursi
Gobe siciid
Jibraacin siciid
Samaroon Siciid
Yuusuf Samaroon [Habar Yuusuf ]
(Ciise Samaroon) 
cisman ciise 
Qeyr ciise
Siciid Samaroon
Habar Makador
Makahil
 Makail Dera (Makayl-Dheere)
Bahabar Abdalo
Celi makaahiil
Ciye makaahiil
hassan makaahiil [Bahabar Xasan]
muuse makaahiil
jibriil muuse (( Afgaduud ))
Bah sanayo 
 jibril Yūnus
 Adan Yūnus
 Nur Yūnus (Reer Nuur)
 Ali Yoonis 
Mahad 'Asse
Reer maxamed
Bahabr Abokr 
Bahabr Aden 
Bahabr 'Eli 
Abrayn
Bahabar muuse
Habar 'Affan
muusafiin
reer xaamud 
faroole 
xeebjire
cali ganuun
Madahwein
Akisho
Jaarso
Gurgura
Gurre
Gariire
Bursuk
Mahe
Surre 
Quranyow (Garre) 
Biimaal 
Gaadsen
Daadoow
Sa'ad
Da'ud
Suleiman (Saleiban)
Ismiin
Bajimal

Notable Dir figures 
Ahmed Shide, current minister of finance of Ethiopia.
Abdi Hassan Buni, politician, minister of British Somaliland and first deputy prime minister of the Somali Republic.
 Abdi Ismail Samatar, Somali scholar, writer and professor.
 Ahmad-Naaji Ibrahim Bakal, Charge d’ Affaires a.i. of the League of Arab States in South Africa. 
 Abdi Sinimo, a Somali singer and songwriter, noted for having established the balwo genre of Somali music.
 Abdi Warsame Isaq, chairman of the Southern Somali National Movement.
Abdikarim Yusuf Adam, previous leader of Somali National Army
 Abdirahman Aw Ali Farrah, first Somaliland Vice President between 1993 and 1997.
 Abdirahman Beyle, former Foreign Affairs Minister of Somalia an economist
 Abdirahman Ibbi, former Deputy Prime Minister of Somalia, Minister of Information and is serving as Member of the Federal Parliament of Somalia.
 Abdirahman Sayli'i, current vice-president of Somaliland
 Abdo Hamargoodh, Djiboutian musician
Said Hamargoodh, Djiboutian musician
 Abdourahman Waberi, novelist
 Abdullahi Sheikh Ismail, former Somali Ambassador to Russian federation and former foreign minister
 Abdusalam Hadliye, Foreign Affairs Minister of Somalia; former Governor of the Central Bank of Somalia
 Aden Isaq Ahmed, Minister and Politician of the Somali Republic
 Aden Robleh Awaleh, president of the National Democratic Party.
 Aden Nuriye, part of the prominent Ambassadorial Brothers, and former Djiboutian ambassador and current adviser to the President of Djibouti
 Ahmed Gerri of the Habar Maqdi (Makadi)/Makadur of the Conquest of Abyssinia
 Ahmed Boulaleh, Djiboutian politician
 Ahmed Gabobe, Minister of Justice and Religious Affairs of Somalia.
 Ahmed Ismail Samatar, Somali writer, professor and former dean of the Institute for Global Citizenship at Macalester College. Editor of Bildhaan: An International Journal of Somali Studies
 Ato Hussein Ismail. Ethiopian long-serving Statesman and first Somali to become member of the Ethiopian Parliament
 Ato Shemsedin, Somali Ethiopian Politician, previous Ethiopian ambassador to Djibouti, Kenya, Deputy Minister of Mining and Energy and first Vice Chairman and one of the founders of ESDL
 Ayanleh Souleiman, Djiboutian athlete
 Barkhad Awale Adan, Somali journalist and director of Radio Hurma
 Daher Ahmed Farah, Djiboutian politician
 Dahir Riyale Kahin, third President of Somaliland
 Djama Ali Moussa. First Senator of Djibouti or French Somaliland
 Djama Rabile, a Somali statesman of the former Somali Republic and Somali Democratic Republic.
 Haji Ibrahim Nur, minister, merchant and politician of former British Somaliland Protectorate
 Hassan Gouled Aptidon (1916-2006), first President of Djibouti from 1977 to 1999.
 Hassan Mead, American distance runner
 Hassan Sheikh Mumin, author of Shabeel Naagood or (Leopard among the Women)
 Hibo Nura, a Somali singer
 Hussein Ahmed Salah, Djiboutian marathon runner.
 Ismaïl Omar Guelleh, current President of Djibouti 
 Ismail Nuriye, part of the prominent Ambassadorial Brothers, and former Ethiopian ambassador
 Khadija Qalanjo, a popular Somali singer
 Mahmoud Harbi, vice-president of the Government Council of French Somaliland.
 Ahmed Goumane-Roble: Djiboutian Politician
 Mawlid Hayir, current vice-president and minister of education and former governor of Jigjiga zone of the Somali region of Ethiopia.
 Mohamed Fourchette, Djiboutian musician
 Lula Ali Ismaïl, Djiboutian-Canadian film director
 Aden Farah Samatar, Djiboutian Musician
 Moumina Houssein Darar, Djiboutian Anti-Terrorism police investigator.
 Aden Farah, Speaker of House of Federation - Ethiopia
 Fadumo Ahmed Dhimbiil, Djiboutian Musician
 Xabiiba Cabdilaahi, Djiboutian Musician
 Mohamed Dubad, Somali politician, served as member of Somalia parliament and Charge D'Affaires in the United Nations
 Mohamed Nuriye, part of the prominent Ambassadorial Brothers, and former ambassador for Somalia.
 Moumin Bahdon, Djiboutian politician.
 Mumin Gala, Djiboutian athlete
 Col. Muse Rabile Ghod, a Somali military leader and statesman of the Somali Democratic Republic.
 Nima Djama, Djiboutian musician
 Hussein Ahmed Salah, Djiboutian marathon runner.
 Omar Farah Iltireh, Djiboutian politician
 Omar Osman Rabe, Somali scholar, writer, professor, politician and pan-Somalist.
 Roble Olhaye, permanent representative to the United Nations for the Republic of Djibouti.
Sheikh Yusuf Sheikh Ibrahim,
 Sheikh Yusuf Direed, Central Somalia Religious Leader 
 Sheikh Abdi Abikar Gafle, famous religious leader and warrior
 Sheikh 'Abdurahman Sh. Nur, religious leader, qādi and the inventor of the Borama script.
 Suleiman Ahmed Guleid – President of Amoud University
 Sultan Dideh, sultan of Zeila, prosperous merchant and built first mosque in Djibouti. He also proposed the name "Cote francaise des Somalis" to the French
 Ughaz 'Elmi Warfa, 13th Malak (King) of the Gadabursi.
 Ughaz Nur II,  11th Malak (King) of the Gadabursi.
 Yacin Bouh, Djiboutian politician.
 Yussur Abrar, former governor of the Central Bank of Somalia.
Yusuf Tallan, previous leader of Somali National Army
Yusuf bin Ahmad al-Kawneyn

Historical publications
Bughyaat al-amaal fii taariikh as-Soomaal, published in Mogadishu, Shariif 'Aydaruus Shariif 'Ali
 Political History of Lower Shabelle, Dr. Mohamed Abukar Mahad (Gaetano)

See also
Somali aristocratic and court titles

Notes

Sources

Somali clans
Somali clans in Ethiopia